Michael Cohen (22 March 1945 – 2 February 2013) was the William D. Hamilton Collegiate Professor of Complex Systems, Information and Public Policy at the University of Michigan.

Early life and education
Cohen received his B.A. in History at Stanford University in 1966, and his Ph.D. in Social Science at the University of California, Irvine in 1972.

Career
Cohen's research centered on learning and adaptation within organizations in response to changing environments. He wrote many articles and books which contributed to theories of organizational decision making. Much of his work employed computer simulation.

Garbage can model

In 1972, as a NSF-SSRC post-doctoral fellow at Stanford University, Cohen worked with James G. March and visiting professor Johan Olsen from the University of Bergen. Together they published the paper; A Garbage Can Model of Organizational Choice. The paper, since frequently cited, describes the garbage can model, a model which disconnects problems, solutions and decision makers from each other. This was a novel approach compared to traditional decision theory. The paper includes Fortran source code to demonstrate the model.

Complexity
By 1981, Cohen was working at the University of Michigan.

Cohen's research and publication continued to use computers to model complex organizational behavior. In 1995 he worked with Robert Axtell, Robert Axelrod and Joshua M. Epstein and compared two agent based models; Axelrod's model with Epstein and Axtell's Sugarscape.

In 2000 Cohen and Axelrod went on to publish a book on complexity in organizations: Harnessing Complexity: Organizational Implications of a Scientific Frontier.

Other works
Cohen's later work included studies in organizational behavior in hospitals, with a view to improving patient care. Much of this work focused on "handoffs"; the transfer of responsibility for patients from one team or department to another.

Selected publications

1970-1980
 
  (1st edition, 1974, New York:McGraw-Hill, Chinese edition 2006.)

1980-1990

1990-2000
  Special edition. (Reprinted, with additions and a new introduction, by SAGE Publications, November, 1995.)
  (Also published in Computational and Mathematical Organization Theory, volume 1, number 2, February, 1996, pp. 123–141.)
  with comments by Benjamin Coriat (Also published in Industrial and Corporate Change, volume 5, number 3, 1996, pp. 653–698)
 
  (Paperback; 2001, Basic Books . Editions in French, 2001, and Japanese, 2003.)

2000-2010
 
 
 
 
 
  (Comments on 'Toward a Neo-Schumpeterian Theory of the Firm' by Sidney Winter.)

References

External links
 Michael D. Cohen CV

1945 births
2013 deaths
People from Sheridan, Wyoming
Stanford University alumni
University of California, Irvine alumni
University of Michigan faculty